David Farnsworth was a Colonial-era American Loyalist. He was a British agent during the American Revolutionary War. George Washington had him hanged for his involvement in a plot to destroy the American economy by placing counterfeit money into circulation.

American Revolution
Farnsworth initially joined up with Patriot forces in Cambridge, Massachusetts at the age of 15 in 1775, serving as a drummer and participating in the Battle of Bunker Hill.

The use of counterfeit money has been used as a strategy in warfare for centuries.  The idea is to flood the enemy's economy with fake money, thus devaluing the real money and causing an economic collapse, rendering the enemy unable to fund their side of the war.  During the American Revolutionary War, the Continental Congress decided to create a new Continental currency to fund the war.  Among the people enlisted to print this new currency was Paul Revere.

To counter this, Great Britain enlisted teams of counterfeiters to travel throughout the American Colonies, placing their counterfeits into circulation in the hopes that it would cause an economic disaster. These counterfeiters were known as "shovers," presumably for their ability to "shove" the fake money into everyday use.

David Farnsworth and his partner John Blair were among the best-known of these counterfeiters, having been caught with over $10,000 in fake Continental dollars in their possession.

On October 8, 1778, in a court-martial held in Danbury, Connecticut by order of General Horatio Gates and Brigadier General John Paterson, Farnsworth and Blair were tried for, and convicted of, "being found about the Encampment of the Armies of The United-States as Spies and having a large sum of counterfeit Money about them which they brought from New-York". The sentence of execution was prescribed by a two-thirds vote. On October 23 in Fredericksburg, New York, Commander in Chief George Washington approved the sentence and ordered their immediate execution upon their arrival at General Gates' division. Farnsworth and Blair were executed in Rocky Hill, Hartford County, Connecticut on November 10, 1778.

In popular culture
In fiction, Farnsworth appeared in the Futurama episode "All The Presidents' Heads" as the ancestor of Professor Hubert Farnsworth. As in history, he was presented as a counterfeiter and British agent. However, in an alternate timeline featured in the episode, in which Great Britain won the Revolution and all of North America became known as "West Britannia", he killed George Washington and was granted a dukedom.

References 

Loyalists in the American Revolution from Connecticut
British counterfeiters
British people of the American Revolution
American Revolutionary War executions
Continental Army soldiers
18th-century executions of American people
People executed by the United States military by hanging
1778 deaths
1760 births
Executed spies
British spies during the American Revolution
People executed for forgery
Child soldiers